The four  ("Let us raise"), WAB 41, are settings of the hymn Tantum ergo composed by Anton Bruckner in 1846.

History 
Bruckner composed these four motets A.M.D.G. in 1846 at the beginning of his stay at St. Florian Abbey. The original manuscript, which was stored in the archive of Neuer Dom of Linz, was lost in the process. Voice scores can still be found in the archive of the St. Florian Abbey.

In 1888, Bruckner revised these four settings, as well as the next setting in D major. The revised version of the five Tantum ergo was published first by Johann Groß, Innsbruck in 1893. In this first edition the ordering for the 4 compositions was deviating from the original ordering by the composer. The WAB ordering, which is based on this first edition, deviates also from the original ordering by the composer.

The 1846 and 1888 versions are put in Band XXI/12 and 37 of the  respectively.

Music 

The works are scored for  choir and organ ad lib. The first setting, in B-flat major (WAB 41.3) is 25-bar long. The three other settings in A-flat major (WAB 41.4), E-flat major (WAB 41.1), and C major (WAB 41.2), are 24-bar long. Afterwards a 2- (3-)bar Amen was added to the settings.

In the 1888 version the settings are score for mixed choir a cappella.

Selected discography 
The first recording occurred in 1931:
 Ferdinand Habel, Domchor zu St. Stephan (Vienna) – 78 rpm Christschall 130A (Tantum ergo in C major, 1846 version)

1846 version 
There is a single recording with all four Tantum ergo:
 Thomas Kerbl, Chorvereinigung Bruckner 09, Anton Bruckner Chöre/Klaviermusik – CD:  LIVA 034 (first strophe only)

1888 version 
There are four recordings with all four Tantum ergo:
 Magnar Mangersnes, Domchor Bergen, Bruckner: Motets – CD: Simax PSC 9037, 1996
 Petr Fiala, Tschechischer Philharmonischer Chor Brno, Anton Bruckner: Motets - CD: MDG 322 1422-2, 2006
 Erwin Ortner, Arnold Schoenberg Chor, Anton Bruckner: Tantum ergo - CD: ASC Edition 3, issue of the choir, 2008
Sigvards Klava, Latvian Radio Choir, Bruckner: Latin Motets, 2019 – CD Ondine OD 1362

References

Sources 
 Max Auer, Anton Bruckner als Kirchenmusiker, G. Bosse, Regensburg, 1927
 Anton Bruckner – Sämtliche Werke, Band XXI: Kleine Kirchenmusikwerke, Musikwissenschaftlicher Verlag der Internationalen Bruckner-Gesellschaft, Hans Bauernfeind and Leopold Nowak (Editor), Vienna, 1984/2001
 Cornelis van Zwol, Anton Bruckner 1824–1896 – Leven en werken, uitg. Thoth, Bussum, Netherlands, 2012.

External links 
 
  – Tantum ergo in B-flat major (1888 version)
  – Tantum ergo in A-flat major (1888 version)
  – Tantum ergo in E-flat major (1888 version)
  – Tantum ergo in C major (1888 version)
 Vier Tantum ergo WAB 41/1-4 Critical discography by Hans Roelofs 
 Live performances of the four Tantum ergo (1888 version) by the Catholic Choir of South-Korea (2015) can be heard on YouTube: Tantum ergo in B-flat major, Tantum ergo in A-flat major, Tantum ergo in E-flat major, Tantum ergo in C major

Motets by Anton Bruckner
1846 compositions
Compositions in B-flat major
Compositions in A-flat major
Compositions in E-flat major
Compositions in C major